Jackson Saigilu Ole Looseyia   (born 1967 in  Masai Mara in Kenya ) is the son of a hunter gatherer and presenter on the BBC show Big Cat Live.  He maintains a blog documenting his guide and documentary work.  He contributed to the grasslands episode of the BBC production Human Planet, leading the crew to film Dorobo people stealing meat from lions.

Sources
 http://www.bbc.co.uk/bigcat/presenters/jacksonlooseyia/

References

1967 births
Living people
BBC people
Kenyan bloggers